Béatrice Romand (born 1952, Birkhadem, French Algeria) is a French actress. She is best known for her work with director Éric Rohmer in such films as Claire's Knee, Love in the Afternoon, A Good Marriage, Le Rayon vert and Autumn Tale.

She also appeared on television in Graf Yoster gibt sich die Ehre, a German detective show.

Selected filmography

References

External links
 
 Official website

French film actresses
French television actresses
1952 births
Living people
20th-century French actresses
People from Algiers Province
Pieds-Noirs